Safonovo is a town and the administrative center of Safonovsky District in Smolensk Oblast, Russia, located on the Vopets River  northeast of Smolensk, the administrative center of the oblast. Population:

Climate
Safonovo has a warm-summer humid continental climate (Dfb in the Köppen climate classification).

<div style="width:70%;">

History
The village of Safonovo was first mentioned in 1859. In 1918, it became the administrative center of Safonovskaya Volost, and since 1929 it served as the administrative center of Safonovsky District. In the 1930s, large deposits of brown coal were discovered there. In 1938, the village was granted urban-type settlement status, and in 1952—town status.

Administrative and municipal status
Within the framework of administrative divisions, Safonovo serves as the administrative center of Safonovsky District. As an administrative division, it is incorporated within Safonovsky District as Safonovskoye Urban Settlement. As a municipal division, this administrative unit also has urban settlement status and is a part of Safonovsky Municipal District.

Economy
Safonovo Electric Machines Factory—a manufacturer of powerful electric motors and generators, and PO Avangard—a significant producer of parts made out of glass- and carbon-fiber-reinforced polymers, are located in the town.

References

Notes

Sources

External links
Official website of Smolensk Oblast. History of Safonovo 

Cities and towns in Smolensk Oblast
Dorogobuzhsky Uyezd